Christopher Tostrup Paus, Count of Paus (10 September 1862 – 10 September 1943) was a Norwegian landowner, heir to the timber firm Tostrup & Mathiesen, papal chamberlain and count, known as philanthropist, art collector and socialite in the late 19th and early 20th centuries. He inherited a fortune from his grandfather, timber magnate Christopher Tostrup, and lived for decades in Rome; in 1923 he bought the estate Herresta in Sweden which is still owned by descendants of his cousin Herman Paus who was married to a granddaughter of Leo Tolstoy. He gave large donations to museums in Scandinavia and to the Catholic Church. A convert to Catholicism, he was appointed as a papal chamberlain by Pope Benedict XV in 1921 and conferred the title of count by Pope Pius XI in 1923. He was the recipient of numerous papal and Scandinavian honours. He was a first cousin once removed of playwright Henrik Ibsen and was the only Ibsen relative to visit Ibsen during his decades-long exile when he wrote his most famous works.

Biography

Born in Christiania, he belonged to the Skien branch of the Paus family, and was the son of Major and War Commissioner in Molde Johan Altenborg Paus (1833–1894) and Agnes Tostrup (1839–1863). His father was a son of lawyer and judge Henrik Johan Paus (1799–1893), who owned the estate Østerhaug in Elverum, while his mother was a daughter of timber magnate Christopher Henrik Holfeldt Tostrup (1804–1881), one of the two main owners of Tostrup & Mathiesen, one of Norway's largest timber companies. Christopher Paus's father was also a first cousin of playwright Henrik Ibsen. As a young man, Christopher Paus would visit the then-famous Henrik Ibsen in Rome, where he lived. His great-grandfather Christian Lintrup was one of the pioneers of the medical profession in Norway.

Christopher Paus became a millionaire as a young man when he inherited a fortune from his maternal grandfather and his two childless uncles Oscar and Thorvald Tostrup, who were all co-owners of Tostrup & Mathiesen. His family sold their shares of Tostrup & Mathiesen to their business partners, the Mathiesen family, in the 1890s, and the company was since renamed Mathiesen Eidsvold Værk and continued under that name and as Moelven Industrier. His maternal grandfather had also owned the estate Kjellestad in Stathelle.

A convert from Lutheranism to Roman Catholicism, he was appointed a Privy Chamberlain of the Sword and Cape (Cameriere Segreto di Spada e Cappa) by Pope Benedict XV on 22 February 1921 and re-appointed by Pope Pius XI on 8 February 1922 and by Pope Pius XII on 7 March 1939. By tradition, a Norwegian Catholic would hold this position, and he succeeded Wilhelm Wedel-Jarlsberg who held the post some years earlier. He was conferred the title and rank of Count by Pope Pius XI on 25 May 1923. He bought the estate Narverød near Tønsberg (Norway) in 1892, the estate Trystorp with château in Lekeberg (Sweden) in 1914, and the estate Herresta outside Mariefred (Sweden) in 1923. In 1942, he bought the mansion Magleås outside Copenhagen in Denmark. He divided his time between his various properties in Scandinavia and Rome.

Christopher Paus was a major art collector, and notably owned the largest collection of Greek and Roman art in Scandinavia, which he largely donated to the National Gallery of Norway in 1918. He also made donations to museums throughout the Nordic countries and in Rome.

He died in Skodsborg in Denmark without children in 1943, and bequeathed much of his estate to select members of the Paus family. In 1938, Herresta was sold to his second cousin Herman Paus, who had married Countess Tatyana Tolstoy, a granddaughter of Leo Tolstoy; their descendants still own Herresta and other Swedish estates. Magleås was inherited by Thorleif Paus, who sold it to the Catholic Church some years later. It was held a mass for him, as a member of the Papal Court, in the Pope's private chapel on 14 September 1943 with Pope Pius XII in attendance. He is buried at Vår Frelsers gravlund in Oslo, in the same grave as his mother, maternal grandfather and other members of the Tostrup family.

Titles and honours

He was usually known as Christopher Tostrup Paus in Norway, but like some other family members he used the name de Paus abroad as an international form of the name; in the Acta Apostolicae Sedis and the Annuario Pontificio, his name is partially translated into Italian as (conte) Cristoforo de Paus.

Honours

Papal and Catholic honours
 Knight of the Order of Pius IX
 Knight Grand Cross of the Order of St. Gregory the Great
 Knight Commander with star of the Order of the Holy Sepulchre
 Knight of the Magistral Grace in gremio religionis of the Sovereign Military Order of Malta (1924)
 Knight Grand Cross of the Sacred Military Constantinian Order of Saint George (1923)
 Gentleman of the Chamber

Scandinavian orders of knighthood
 Commander with Star (Stórriddarakross með stjörnu) of the Order of the Falcon (1937) (Commander, 1924)
 Commander of the Order of St. Olav (1938) (Knight First Class, 1919)
 Commander of the Order of the Dannebrog (1922)
 Commander of the Order of Vasa
 Knight First Class of the Order of the White Rose of Finland

A list of honours as of 1934 is found in the book Den Kongelige Norske St. Olavs Orden.

Ancestry

See also
Lagergren

References

Counts of Italy
Papal counts
Papal chamberlains
Norwegian Roman Catholics
Converts to Roman Catholicism from Lutheranism
Christopher de
Knights of Malta
Knights Grand Cross of the Order of St Gregory the Great
Commanders of the Order of the Dannebrog
Grand Knights with Star of the Order of the Falcon
Commanders of the Order of Vasa
Knights of the Order of Pope Pius IX
Knights of the Holy Sepulchre
Henrik Ibsen
Burials at the Cemetery of Our Saviour
1862 births
1943 deaths